Peter Milton Walsh is an Australian singer-songwriter and guitarist best known for his band, The Apartments.

The Apartments
Peter Milton Walsh is the sole singer songwriter for The Apartments, formed in Brisbane in 1978 and named after Billy Wilder's 1960 film The Apartment.

The Go-Betweens, a Brisbane band Walsh was a member of briefly, wrote “Don't Let Him Come Back” commemorating Walsh's style and his time with them "Here he comes, with his twelve o’clock junk...who's that dressed in black? Who's that in his apartment?"  This song, still performed by Robert Forster, was covered by Jay Reatard in 2008.

The close connection continued with Walsh writing liner notes Volume 1 and Volume 2 of G Stands for Go-Betweens: The Go-Betweens Anthology, the only writer to appear on both volumes. 
   As an ex-band member and close confidant of Robert Forster and Grant McLennan, Walsh also appeared in the Kriv Stenders documentary Right Here.

A gifted writer Walsh has published pieces online and in print including “The Man with a Blue Cornflower” and appeared at the 2016 Brisbane Rock and Roll Writers Festival.

Personal circumstances saw Walsh remove himself from public life in 1997, at which point he stopped recording and touring. He resumed international performances in 2009 in France, having taken part in the 2007 Pig City: Brisbane's Historical Soundtrack a one-day music festival held as part of the Queensland Music Festival . From that point onwards Walsh has released a range of recordings by The Apartments, including two live and one studio albums, a single and one live EP, re-issues of three earlier albums.  He continues to tour in Australia and Europe, usually with a full band and at times as a solo performer.   Based in Sydney Australia after having lived in London and New York in the 1980s, 2018 saw Walsh based in France for an extended period, supporting his band's touring and his personal collaborations with other artists.

While The Apartments line up evolves based on the location of shows, key collaborators in Australia and France form the backbone of the band.   The latest release LIVE at L’Ubu included band members from Australia, the UK and France which toured France in 2015.

Walsh's songs have been covered by This Mortal Coil with "Mr Somewhere" on their 1991 album Blood.  Ed Kuepper performed "Places Where The Night Is Long" on his 1995 album " Exotic Mail Order Moods".

Walsh wrote  "The Shyest Time" which was featured on the soundtrack of John Hughes' movie Some Kind of Wonderful.

In 2017 he appeared as guest vocalist on "Attention to Life", a track on UK-based Piano Magic's final album, Closure

American writer Kirsti Coulter published in August 2018 The Sad Boys of Sadcore in The Paris Review detailing her following of both Peter Milton Walsh and Mark Eitzel

Discography
with The Apartments

Albums

Singles, EPs

Compilation tracks
Some Kind of Wonderful Soundtrack (1987), MCA: "The Shyest Time"
POPvolume#1 (1999),POPnews: "Knowing You Were Loved"
Behind the Banana Curtain – a collection of 41 Brisbane bands (2000), 4ZZZ: "Help"
Can't Stop It! Australian Post-Punk 1978-82 (2005) Chapter: "Help"
 Inner City Soundtrack (2005) Laughing Outlaw: "All You Wanted"

with The Go-Betweens
 Lee Remick/I Want to Be Today 7-inch (Beserkley, 1979) – guitar on "I Want to Be Today" Unreleased Single
 Karen/The Sound of Rain 7-inch (Beserkley, 1979) - guitar on "The Sound of Rain" Unreleased Single
 78 'Til 79: The Lost Album (Tag 5, 1999) - guitar on "The Sound of Rain"

with Out of Nowhere
 Forced Audience various artists cassette release with Xero, Four Gods (No Label, 1981)- guitar and vocals
 The Arrangements  Cassette with Pink & Blue (ANTI-MUSIC, 1981) - guitar and vocals
 Remember, Remember/No Resistance 7-inch (Prince Melon, 1982) - guitar and vocals

with Laughing Clowns
 Law of Nature LP (Hot, 1984) bass guitar
 Eternally Yours 12-inch (Hot, 1984) bass guitar
 Crystal Clear/Law of Nature 7-inch Flexidisc (Sydney Trade Union Club, 1984) bass guitar

References

Living people
Australian singer-songwriters
Year of birth missing (living people)